The Rede Ferroviária Federal, Sociedade Anônima (RFFSA, pronounced as Refesa) was the State-owned national railway company of Brazil created from Brazilian Federal Law #3.115 on March 16, 1957, after several railroads were nationalized by the Brazilian government. However, the railroad did not take full effect until September 30, 1957. The RFFSA linked 42 railways together (both on documents and actual railroads), creating a regional system composed of 22 railroads. The goal of the RFFSA was to promote and advance the railroad sector of Brazil, creating a north-south-east-west rail network in all five regions of Brazil. But it failed and the RFFSA only served four of the five regions with a north-south rail network win 19 units of the federation of Brazil. By 1999, freight service of the railroad was liquidated and privatized, with the passenger service of the railroad liquidations occurring in 2007.

Federal Authority

According to Article 7 of Law #3.115 which created the RFFSA, the company was given the following powers for the operation of the railroads:
The company must manage, operate, maintain, refurbish, expand, improve and maintain traffic on the railways it built.
Introduce (at face value) bearer bonds of its own issue or the issue of the companies that will be organized with a limit of two for paid-in capital, with or without a guarantee from the Treasury.
Subscription of capital from companies under its control and the consent to grant them loans or guarantees.
Organize and supervise the management of the companies under its control, as well as its methods and procedures for operation under contract to provide services to guarantee these companies technical assistance, accounting, legal, and administrative services.
Propose revisions and modifications of tariffs, as necessary, to the Departamento Nacional de Estradas de Ferro who would review the proposals and submit the final approval to the Ministro da Viação e Obras Públicas.
Create a business plan and approve the budgets of the companies under its control, monitoring their respective operations.
Restructure staffing quarters of personnel according to the needs of service and regional standards of living set on a fixed number in the companies’ organization, remuneration, rights and duties.
Conduct all the works of studies and construction of railroads which have been approved by the União for which they are provided resources.

The following powers were given to the RFFSA from Law #6.171 in 1974
Monitor the railway services throughout the country.
Promote a coordination of studies and tariff costs for general rail transport.
Create a unification and standardization of the Brazilian Railway System.
Promote a qualitative and quantitative evaluation of the national railway system.
Conduct research relating to the improvement of rail activities in the country.
Enforce the railway into the Plano Nacional de Viação.

Unification of Railways
The twenty-two railways that composed the RFFSA were mostly nationalized by the Brazilian government which chose to merge them administratively.

The following railways were:

Estrada de Ferro Madeira-Mamoré
Estrada de Ferro de Bragança
Estrada de Ferro São Luís-Teresina
Estrada de Ferro Central do Piauí
Rede de Viação Cearense
Estrada de Ferro Mossoró-Sousa
Estrada de Ferro Sampaio Correia
Rede Ferroviária do Nordeste
Viação Férrea Federal do Leste Brasileiro
Estrada de Ferro Bahia-Minas
Estrada de Ferro Leopoldina
Estrada de Ferro Central do Brasil
Rede Mineira de Viação
Estrada de Ferro Goiás
Estrada de Ferro Santos a Jundiaí
Estrada de Ferro Noroeste do Brasil
Rede de Viação Paraná-Santa Catarina
Estrada de Ferro Dona Teresa Cristina

The following railroads were later merged into the RFFSA:
Estrada de Ferro Ilhéus (added in 1959 after a two-year legal battle between the English owners and the Government of Brazil)
Estrada de Ferro Nazaré (added in 1968 for unknown circumstances even though the railroad was already out of service)
Estrada de Ferro Santa Catarina and the Viação Férrea do Rio Grande do Sul (:pt:Viação Férrea do Rio Grande do Sul) (originally leased to the RFFSA, later merged into the RFFSA)
Estrada de Ferro Tocantins (remained under a special regime until 1974, when it was abolished; the railroad was merged away into the RFFSA that same year)

Privatisation and liquidation

Privatization was one of the alternatives for investments to return in railroads. The government of the PSDB gave the public rail lines access to transport cargo. However, most of the railroad companies were not interested in seeing a transport of passengers, as the service was nearly extinct.

Between 1996 and 1998, over 22,000 km of rail lines in Brazil (73% of the entire state rail system) were being transferred to various private organizations, which signed 30-year concessions to operate the railroad systems. The organized private railroad companies will invest $2.1 billion within the 30-year concession as well as increase the volume of traffic, modernize, and expand their railroad systems.

The main goal of privatizing the RFFSA and FEPASA was to end the financial and labor troubles of the railroads, mainly due to a lack of investment by Brazil from the 1980s and the 1990s.

On December 9, 1999, the liquidation of the Ferrovia Paulista S.A. (FEPASA) began as a merger to the RFFSA, and then as an auction in the form of a concession for 20 years. Ferroban was the winner, which has an option to renew the 20-year concession. However, the control was split between América Latina Logística and Brasil Ferrovias.

On December 17, 1999, the liquidation of the RFFSA began by the General Meeting of Shareholders. By May 31, 2007, the liquidation was complete, becoming Brazilian Federal Law #11.483.

Paint schemes
From the first appearance of diesel locomotives in 1957 to the adoption of the SIGO System in 1983, the standard colors of the RFFSA were Cadmium Red accented with two Lemon yellow stripes and black undercarriage. Depending on the RFFSA subsidiary that existed, the lower stripe was widened to accommodate the subsidiary's reporting marks. From 1983 until 1996, the RFFSA removed all subsidiary markings and applied the locomotive's number in the same position.

In 1993, the RFFSA held a contest celebrating the presence of diesel traction in Brazil. This contest created a new paint scheme for its locomotives in recognition of the development of Brazil's railway system from the use of diesel locomotives. Held at the D. Pedro II Railway Station in Rio de Janeiro, the contest became a rail festival as it was open to the public with a plethora of support from various sectors of the RFFSA, professional associations, and the railroad's customers.

To participate in this contest, the only requirement was a display board showcasing the new paint scheme design by the participant. The locomotive model chosen as the template for the new paint scheme design was an EVISA GT22CUM-1. When the winning design was selected from the contest, an actual GT22CUM-1 would receive the paint scheme.

On December 6, 1993, Paulo H. S. Cavalieri from Juiz de Fora was declared the winner of the new paint scheme out of 97 participants.  Cavalieri was not the first-place winner but was third. RFFSA President Renato Almeida chose Cavalieri's Ash Grey and Lemon Yellow design based on the factors of a good way to promote the company systemwide and the simplicity of cost saving graphics/paint for easy application.

Shortly before an actual GT22CUM-1 was to receive the new paint scheme, the RFFSA management did a final adjustment to the design where a large RFFSA logo was to be applied along the locomotive's carbody instead of Cavlieri's fading strokes version.

On March 2, 1994, EVISA GT22CUM-1 #4605-4L emerged from the workshops of Ponta Grossa with Cavalieri's modified scheme. The locomotive was named Curitiba in honor of the city where the new paint scheme was put into effect on March 1, 1994. Shortly after the 4605-4L was released, any locomotive scheduled for maintenance was to receive the new scheme. Depending on various reasons from the workshops, the locomotives are permitted to be named.

With the paint scheme known to railfans as "Fase II", it was short lived from 1993 to 1996. Although visibility increased from far distances with the yellow, it was flawed with easily becoming dirty after a few months. By late 1995 and into 1996, the RFFSA was heavily in debt to clean or paint a locomotive that most of the grime left the locomotives black.

In contrast to Cavalieri's scheme being selected, the actual winner who won first but was not the selected scheme was Eike Pereira de Souza, an architect from the Department of Auto Graphics of the RFFSA. He won a cash prize of 200,000 Cruzeiros.

The SIGO System

The SIGO was a system implemented in 1983 to standardize the numbering system of railway vehicles in Brazil. Each piece of rolling stock is allocated a six-digit number, a check digit, and a letter to indicate its allocation. When the RFFSA began to repaint its locomotives of both Metric and Irish Gauges in Ash Grey and Lemon Yellow (1994–1996), the numbers were relocated towards the radiator section of the locomotive. In some cases, the locomotives were baptized with names, municipalities, states, or cities of there they respectively operated.

With locomotives, the first two digits are hidden, and used only on documents, e.g. 905212-7F.
 '90' represents: RFFSA locomotive (only written in documents).
 '5212' is the roadnumber of the locomotive.
 '-7' is the check digit.
 'F' is the letter code for where the locomotive is located (The 'F' indicates: Juiz de Fora - Sector SR-3).

Locomotives
Click on image to enlarge

Present day Brazilian railway companies
Metropolitan transit
 Compania Brasileira de Trens Urbanos -- CBTU - controlled by Ministry of Cities and Ministry of Transports - gauges:  - commuter metropolitan services operating in Belo Horizonte, Recife, João Pessoa, Natal and Maceió Cities -
 Companhia Paulista de Trens Metropolitanos – CPTM – commuter services in São Paulo city and suburbs; controlled by the state of São Paulo – gauges: , on the two former Sorocabana lines 
 Concessionária de Transporte Ferroviário S.A. – SuperVia – commuter services in Rio de Janeiro city and suburbs – gauges: , on the former Estrada de Ferro Leopoldina 
 Empresa de Trens Urbanos de Porto Alegre – TRENSURB – commuter services in Porto Alegre, RS and suburbs – gauge: 

Freight services
 América Latina Logística S.A. – ALL (former Ferrovia Sul Atlântico (FSA)) – gauge: 
 Companhia Ferroviária do Nordeste – CFN – controlled by Transnordestina Logística S.A. – gauge: 
 Estrada de Ferro do Amapá – from 1953 to 2006 controlled by Empresa Indústria e Comércio de Minério S.A. (ICOMI), since then by MMX Mineração e Metálicos S.A. (MMX); this is one of two Brazilian railways with  gauge, the other being Line 5 of São Paulo Metro.
 Estrada de Ferro Carajás – EFC – controlled by Companhia Vale do Rio Doce (CVRD) – gauge: 
 Estrada de Ferro Campos do Jordão – EFCJ – controlled by the department of tourism of the state of São Paulo – gauge: 
 Estrada de Ferro Jari – EFJ – gauge: 
 Estrada de Ferro Trombetas – EFT – controlled by Mineiração Rio do Norte – gauge: 
 Estrada de Ferro Vitória a Minas – EFVM – controlled by Companhia Vale do Rio Doce (CVRD) – gauge: 
 Ferrovia Centro-Atlântica S.A. – FCA – controlled by Companhia Vale do Rio Doce (CVRD) – gauge: 
 Ferrovia Norte-Sul – FNS – controlled by Companhia Vale do Rio Doce (CVRD) – gauge: 
 Ferrovia Norte Brasil – FERRONORTE – formerly controlled by Brasil Ferrovias, then incorporated by ALL – gauge: 
 Ferrovia Novoeste S.A. – NOVOESTE – formerly controlled by Brasil Ferrovias, then incorporated by ALL – gauge: 
 Ferrovia Paraná Oeste – FERROPAR – also known as FERROESTE
 Ferrovia Teresa Cristina S.A. – FTC – gauge: 
 MRS Logística S.A. – MRS – gauge: 
 Tramway Bertioga - Itatinga – controlled by the state of São Paulo's port authority Companhia Docas do Estado de São Paulo (CODESP); more a local railway than an actual tramway – gauge:

Preservation Groups

 Associação Brasileira de Preservação Ferroviária - ABPF

See also 
 History of rail transport in Brazil

References

External links 
 Portal CBTU - História

Defunct companies of Brazil
Companies based in Minas Gerais
Railway companies of Brazil
Metre gauge railways in Brazil
5 ft 3 in gauge railways in Brazil
Government-owned companies of Brazil